
Gmina Krzanowice, German Gemeinde Kranowitz is an urban-rural gmina (administrative district) in Racibórz County, Silesian Voivodeship, in southern Poland, on the Czech border.

Since 2008 the commune has been bilingual in German and Polish, and has its signs in two languages. These signs celebrate the multicultural past of the region, which was prior to 1945 part of Germany and still maintains a large German population.

Administrative divisions
Apart from the town of Krzanowice, Gmina Krzanowice contains the villages and settlements of Krzanowice, Bojanów, Borucin, Pietraszyn and Wojnowice.

Neighbouring gminas
Gmina Krzanowice is bordered by the town of Racibórz and by the gminas of Krzyżanowice and Pietrowice Wielkie. It also borders the Czech Republic.

Twin towns – sister cities

Gmina Krzanowice is twinned with:
 Strahovice, Czech Republic

Gallery

References

Krzanowice
Racibórz County